The Party of the Hungarian Community  (SMK-MKP), formerly known as Party of the Hungarian Coalition, was a political party in Slovakia for the ethnic Hungarian minority. It was led by Pál Csáky (formerly led by Béla Bugár) until the parliamentary election of 12 June 2010 where it failed to acquire 5% of the popular vote, the threshold necessary for entering the National Council of the Slovak Republic. Its votes went largely to Most–Híd, a new party led by former SMK leader Béla Bugár. In response, Csáky and the whole party leadership resigned. SMK-MKP later merged with Most–Híd and another Hungarian minority party (Unity) to form the Alliance in late 2021.

History
The party was founded in 1998 in response to an anti-coalition law passed.  The law prevented parties from forming electoral cartels at election time, which small parties had used to overcome the 5% electoral threshold.  Three parties representing the Hungarian minority had formed such a cartel, called 'Hungarian Coalition' in the 1994 election, and had won 10.2% of the vote.  To comply with the new law, the three parties – the Hungarian Christian Democratic Movement, Coexistence, and the Hungarian Civic Party – merged to form the Party of the Hungarian Coalition.

Following the 2002 parliamentary election in Slovakia, the Party of the Hungarian Coalition joined the Slovak governing coalition for the second time (after the 1998–2002 term), obtained 321,069 votes (11.16% of all votes), and was the most stable political party in the governing coalition. At the EU parliament election in 2004 the party won 13.24% of the vote.

The party had 4 ministers (Pál Csáky – Deputy Prime Minister for European Integration and Minority Rights, László Miklós – Minister of Environment, László Gyurovszky – Minister of Construction and Regional Development and Zsolt Simon – Minister of Agriculture) and 6 state secretaries (Ministry of Finance, Ministry of Education, Ministry of Economy, Ministry of Culture, Ministry of Foreign Affairs and Ministry of Construction and Regional Development) in the Slovak government. Béla Bugár, the president of the Party of the Hungarian Coalition at that time, was the Vice President of the National Council of the Slovak Republic.

In the parliamentary election of 17 June 2006, the party won 11.7% of the popular vote and 20 out of 150 seats, but lost its participation in the government. In the parliamentary election of 12 June 2010, the party missed the 5% border needed for participation in parliament by receiving 4.33% and lost its position in parliament. The SMK-MKP also proved unable to obtain 5% of the votes in the 2012 parliamentary election. On 22 September 2012, the party was renamed to Party of the Hungarian Community.

In the 2014 European elections, SMK–MKP came in seventh place nationally, receiving 6.53% of the vote and electing 1 MEP.

International affiliations
SMK-MKP was said to be an ally of the right-wing ruling party of Hungary Fidesz. The party became a member of the European People's Party (EPP) on 7 June 2000 and later their MEPs joined European People's Party group to which Fidesz belonged too. They also shared their affiliation to the Centrist Democrat International.

After the split and formation of Most–Híd, Fidesz maintained close ties to SMK-MKP. After Fidesz' victory in the 2018 Hungarian parliamentary election József Menyhárt called it "good news" for ethnic Hungarian communities. In the 2019 European Parliament election Viktor Orban even publicly endorsed SMK-MKP.

Organisation
The primary party organisations made up the basis of the party. By the end of March 2003, the number of these local organisations was 521 and the number of members was 10,983. The party congress is the highest body of the party. Between two congresses the highest body of the party is the National Council.

Each elected functionary and body gets elected in form of democratic, secret elections. The party leadership of the districts co-ordinates the work of local institutions within district.

Between 1998 and 2007 the party chairman was Béla Bugár. The Chairman of the National Council was Zsolt Komlósy, the Parliamentary Group Leader was Gyula Bárdos and Executive Deputy Chairman was Miklós Duray. Pál Csáky was the chairman of the Minister’s Club.

On 31 March 2007 Pál Csáky was elected for chairman by the assembly of party, thus succeeding the more moderate Béla Bugár.

Béla Bugár established the party Most–Híd on 30 June 2009, stating that Csáky was too nationalist. His new party (its name meaning "bridge" in Hungarian and Slovak) wants to emphasise cooperation between Hungarians and Slovaks.

Chairmen
 Béla Bugár (1998–2007)
 Pál Csáky (2007–2010)
 József Berényi (2010–2016)
 József Menyhárt (2016–2020)
 Krisztián Forró (2020–)

Vice-chairmen
 József Berényi (2020-)
 Iván Farkas (2020-)
 Zoltán Ciprusz (2020-)

Chairmen of the National Council
 Péter Köpöncei (2020-)

Election results

National Council

European Parliament

Footnotes

External links
Official site 

Defunct political parties in Slovakia
Conservative parties in Slovakia
Political parties of minorities in Slovakia
Hungarians in Slovakia
Member parties of the European People's Party
Christian democratic parties in Slovakia
Political parties established in 1998
Political parties disestablished in 2021
1998 establishments in Slovakia
2021 disestablishments in Slovakia
Hungarian minority interests parties